Ireland is in the Atlantic European Province of the Circumboreal Region, a floristic region within the Holarctic.

Composition of the flora
Ireland has a small flora for a European country because of its small size, lack of geological and ecological variation and its Pleistocene history. There are 3,815 species of plant listed for Ireland:
Phylum Anthocerotophyta – hornworts: 3 species
Phylum Bryophyta – mosses: 556 species
Phylum Charophyta – charophytes: 244 species
Phylum Chlorophyta – green algae: 148 species
Phylum Lycopodiophyta – clubmosses: 9 species
Phylum Magnoliophyta – flowering plants: 2,196 species 
Phylum Marchantiophyta – liverworts: 229 species
Phylum Pinophyta – pines: 12 species 
Phylum Pteridophyta – ferns: 79 species
Phylum Rhodophyta – red algae: 339 species

An additional 2,512 species of fungus occur in Ireland.
Phylum Acrasiomycota – cellular slime molds: 1 species
Phylum Ascomycota – sac fungi: 1,115 species
Phylum Basidiomycota – club fungi, mushrooms, shelf fungi, puff balls: 1,228 species
Phylum Chytridiomycota – chytrids: 4 species
Phylum Microsporidia – 1 species
Phylum Myxomycota – plasmodial slime moulds: 112 species
Phylum Oomycota – water moulds: 40 species
Phylum Zygomycota – pin or sugar moulds: 11 species

History of the flora: after the Pleistocene

Ice-sheets covered most of Ireland until 13,000 years ago when the Holocene began. The majority of Ireland's flora and fauna has only returned as the ice sheets retreated and sea level rose accompanied by post-glacial rebound when 10,000 years ago the climate began to warm. At this time there was a land bridge connecting Wales and the east coast of Ireland since sea levels were over 100 metres lower than they are today (water being frozen into the ice caps covering northern Asia and North America). Plants and animals were able to cross this land-bridge until about 7,500 years ago, when it was finally covered by the rising sea level as warming continued.

Mesolithic hunters entered Ireland around 8000 BC beginning human occupation and from the 
Neolithic landscape was progressively altered by agriculture, especially in the 19th and 20th centuries. Aside from the
habitat alteration new species were introduced deliberately or accidentally. The archaeologist Emmet Byrnes and botanist Declan Little, Woodlands of Ireland give a history of woodlands in Ireland.

Habitats

There are two major habitats, making up most of the land area:

Grassland
Grassland includes 
Lowland meadow and pasture with grasses such as sweet vernal grass, perennial ryegrass, meadow foxtail, false oat-grass, crested dog's-tail, Festuca rubra, red fescue, downy oat-grass, Yorkshire fog, timothy grass and yellow oat-grass.

Lowland meadow and pasture flowers include meadow thistle, creeping thistle, spear thistle, pignut, lesser knapweed, meadow thistle, smooth hawksbeard, eyebright, ragged robin, red bartsia, yellow rattle, marsh lousewort, cowslip, catsear, autumn hawkbit, meadow buttercup, bulbous buttercup and dandelion

Upland pasture (mostly semi-natural, that is maintained by particular farming practices such as grazing and mowing). Typical species are: moor matgrass, wavy hair-grass, species of Agrostis, sheep's fescue, green-ribbed sedge, cross-leaved heath, bell heather, bilberry, black crowberry, deergrass and bog asphodel.

Bogs

Importance
Ireland possesses almost  of actively growing bogs and fens. These 200,000 hectares of actively growing raised and blanket bogs and fens are of European conservation importance.

Formation
In Ireland two factors led to the formation of such extensive peatlands. High rainfall- there are 175 rain-days each year in the west, southwest and northwest of Ireland and poor drainage The bogs formed at the end of the last ice age, about 10,000 years ago in the central lowlands of Ireland in basins of calcareous boulder clay. These became lakes overgrown with fen vegetation and infilled with fen peat which cut off the surface plants from mineral-rich water below. Nutrient-demanding fen plants were then replaced by bog mosses and plants which could survive on low levels of nutrients. The fen peat below prevented the rainwater draining away and the sponge-like bog moss and plants soaked it up.

Bog flora
The vascular plants characteristic of raised bogs (an example is the Bog of Allen) include: common heather, cross-leaved heath, bell heather, bogbean, hare's-tail cottongrass, common cottongrass, bog-rosemary, common cranberry, bog asphodel, bog myrtle, Pedicularis sylvatica, round-leaved sundew, oblong-leaved sundew, great sundew, royal fern, species of Utricularia, Juncus squarrosus, common tormentil, black bogrush, bog orchid, Slender Scottish Eyebright (Euphrasia scottica), heath bedstraw, green-ribbed sedge, little green sedge, black crowberry, moor matgrass, soft rush, northern firmoss and wolf's-foot clubmoss.

Cut-out raised bogs are colonised by a wet woodland of birch and alder trees. Characteristic species are downy birch, black alder, grey willow, crack willow, broad buckler fern, narrow buckler fern and remote sedge.

Open water
Open water habitats include rivers, canals, lakes, reservoirs, ponds and, uniquely, turloughs. Common species of wet places include common reed, marsh willowherb, common marsh bedstraw, water avens, angelica, brooklime, marsh pennywort, water plantain, marsh cinquefoil, marsh marigold, watermint, yellow water lily, bulrush and the invasive species Canadian pondweed.

Sea shore
A much smaller fraction is occupied by coastal habitats (muddy shores, rocky shores, sandy shores, shingle beaches, brackish water bodies, saltmarsh, maritime flushes and streams, sea cliffs and sand dunes and machair).

Significant or characteristic species of sand dunes and dune slacks are: Ammophila arenaria, seaside sandplant, sea milkwort, pyramidal orchid, sea holly, sea lyme grass, heartsease, houndstongue, common centaury, fairy flax, seashore false bindweed, dovesfoot cranesbill, bee orchid and stone bramble. Saltmarsh species include Salicornia europaea, sea purslane, sea arrowgrass, greater sea-spurry and common scurvygrass.

Karst
Karst, inland cliffs and scarps

The Burren
Over 70% of Ireland's 900 native species occur in The Burren which is less than 0.5% of the area of Ireland. The Burren contains twelve Annex 1 habitats listed in the EU Habitats Directive. A 2001 survey found 28 different species per square meter (averaged over 1,100 vegetation samples) in upland grasslands, with up to 45 species per square metre in some samples. 22 of Ireland's 27 native orchid species are found in the region. Such high diversity has several explanations. Firstly, several hundred square kilometers of species-rich unimproved limestone grasslands and upland pastures grazed mainly in winter, a practice which removes potentially dominant grass and weed species. Secondly, there is a mixture of Arctic–alpine and Mediterranean species, and calcicole and calcifuge species. The area is dominated by bare rock and rendzina soils.

Woodland

Woodland plants include wood sorrel, blackthorn, bird's nest orchid, wood anemone, bluebell, wood avens, bugle, ramsons, self-heal, dog violet, honeysuckle, holly, lords and ladies, herb robert and woody nightshade. Woods dominated by oak and birch, with lesser amounts of rowan, holly, hazel, yew and aspen are called western oakwoods and occur principally in the uplands of Ireland, Scotland and Wales. They are temperate rainforests.

Artificial habitats

Quarries, gravel and sand pits, roads and railways, field boundaries, walls, waste ground and rubbish tips contain such plant species as common ragwort, pineapple weed, hairy bindweed, creeping buttercup, common daisy, catsear, coltsfoot, fat hen, nettle, redshank, germander speedwell, ivy-leaved toadflax, rosebay willowherb, great willowherb and wall pennywort.

Cultivated ground (arable and horticultural land)

Julie A. Fossitt gives a habitat classification.

Conservation
Threats to the flora include agriculture, drainage, housing developments, golf courses, mowing of roadside verges and introduced species. Conservation agencies include the National Parks and Wildlife Service (Ireland), the Northern Ireland Environment Agency, the Environmental Protection Agency and the Royal Society for the Protection of Birds. There is a Threatened Species Programme at the National Botanic Gardens. There was also a range of Non-Governmental Organisations in Ireland dedicated to preserving plant habitats such as the Irish Peatland Conservation Council, the Irish Wildlife Trust and the Native Woodland Trust.

Herbaria
Major herbaria are conserved at the National Botanic Gardens and the Ulster Museum.

See also
Atlases of the flora and fauna of Britain and Ireland
National Parks in the Republic of Ireland
List of Special Areas of Conservation in Northern Ireland
British National Vegetation Classification - broadly applicable but see Fossitt (2000).
Trees of Britain and Ireland
List of the orchids of Ireland
Landforms of Ireland :Category:Landforms of Ireland
Lusitanian flora
Invasion biology terminology
History of botany in Ireland
Topographia Hibernica An early (1180) account of the flora by Gerald of Wales.
Thomas Dix Hincks On early Contributions to the Flora of Ireland; with Remarks on Mr. Mackay's Flora Hibernica Annals and Magazine of Natural History 6: 1-12 continued 126-135 (1841) and 
Caleb Threlkeld 
John Templeton
Thomas Coulter
Clare Island Survey

Further reading

David Cabot, 2009 Ireland Collins New Naturalist Series  Natural history of Ireland biological history, geology and climate, habitats and nature conservation.Flora and fauna.
Curtis, T. G. F & Thompson R., 2009 The Orchids of Ireland National Museums Northern Ireland  
Curtis, T. G. F. and McGough, H. N. (1988). The Irish Red Data Book. 1: Vascular Plants. The Stationery Office, Dublin.
Declan Doogue and Carsten Krieger, 2010 The wild flowers of Ireland : the habitat guide Dublin : Gill & Macmillan 
Fitzgerald Interactive Flora of the Burren, Ireland Interactive CD  photographs and information on dicotyledon plants of the Burren, the Aran Islands and to the east of Connemara 
Nelson, E. C. & Walsh, W. F. 1991. The Burren: a companion to the wildflowers of an Irish limestone wilderness. Aberystwyth & Bonis: Boethius Press & The Conservancy of The Burren.
Nelson, E. C., 2008 Wild Plants of The Burren and the Aran Islands. New enlarged edition Collins Press  
Green, P.,2008 Flora of County Waterford National Botanic Gardens of Ireland 
O'Mahony, T.,2009 Wildflowers of Cork City and County Collins Press  
McNeill, I., 2010 Flora of County Tyrone National Museums Northern Ireland 
Morton, O. 1994. Marine Algae of Northern Ireland. Ulster Museum publication No. 271. 
Preston C.D., 2007 Which vascular plants are found at the northern or southern edges of their European range in the British Isles? Watsonia 26: 253–26 pdf 
Reilly P. A., 2001 The Flora of County Cavan National Botanic Gardens, Glasnevin 
Reynolds, S. C. P. (2002). A catalogue of alien plants in Ireland. pp. [4], 1–413. Dublin: National Botanical Gardens, Glasnevin.
Scannell, M. J. P. & Synnott, D. M. (1987). Census catalogue of the flora of Ireland. A list of Pteridophyta, Gymnospermae and Angiospermae including all the native plants and established aliens known to occur in Ireland with the distribution of each species, and recommended Irish and English names. pp. [i]-xxvii, 1–171, map. Dublin: Stationery Office.
Smith, A. J. E. The Moss Flora of Britain and Ireland Cambridge University Press

References

External links

Habitas.org: Flora of Northern Ireland
Habitas.org: Lichen of Ireland
 National Biodiversity Network: Distribution Maps — (ongoing project).
The Flora of Ireland National Botanic Gardens, Dublin — overview and downloadable free lists of vascular plants, Bryophyta, and Characeae.
Red Data List Vascular Plants of Ireland 
BiodiversityIreland.ie: National Biodiversity Data Centre — (Waterford)
Herbaria United — choose Ireland from the country menu to view digital images of 3000+ herbarium specimens collected in Ireland.
Species.ie: Irish Species Register — access the lists via the Taxonomy Browser.
Biological Records Centre.uk: Online Atlas of the British and Irish flora  — access by species.
Irish Wildflowers website — very well planned with species listed A–Z, by habitat, by flowering time, and by colour + "amateur" images rich.
Burrenbeo.com: Ecology learning library
Fieldmycology.net: Fungal Records Database for Britain and Ireland
Northern Ireland Fungus Group  — image rich gallery.
National Parks and Wildlife Service of Ireland
BSBI Maps
Pleistocene History
UCD Publications on boglands

 
F
F